Thoracibidion is a genus of beetles in the family Cerambycidae, containing the following species:

 Thoracibidion buquetii (Thomson, 1867)
 Thoracibidion fasciiferum (Berg, 1889)
 Thoracibidion flavopictum (Perty, 1832)
 Thoracibidion franzae Martins, 1968
 Thoracibidion galbum Martins, 1968
 Thoracibidion insigne Martins, 1968
 Thoracibidion io (Thomson, 1867)
 Thoracibidion lineatocolle (Thomson, 1865)
 Thoracibidion pleurostictum (Bates, 1885)
 Thoracibidion ruficaudatum (Thomson, 1865)
 Thoracibidion striatocolle (White, 1855)
 Thoracibidion terminatum Martins, 1968
 Thoracibidion tomentosum Martins, 1960

References

Ibidionini